The 2021–22 Cleveland State Vikings men's basketball team represented Cleveland State University in the 2021–22 NCAA Division I men's basketball season. The Vikings, led by third-year head coach Dennis Gates, played their home games at the Wolstein Center in Cleveland, Ohio as members of the Horizon League. They finished the season 20–11, 15–6 in Horizon League play to earn a share of the regular season championship for the second consecutive year. As the No. 1 seed in the Horizon League tournament, they defeated Robert Morris in the quarterfinals before losing to Wright State in the semifinals. As a regular season champion that did not win their conference tournament, they received an automatic bid to the National Invitation Tournament. They lost in the first round of the NIT to Xavier.

Previous season
In a season limited due to the ongoing COVID-19 pandemic, the Vikings finished the 2020–21 season 19–8, 16–4 in Horizon League play to finish as Horizon League regular season co-champions. As the No. 1 seed in the Horizon League tournament, they defeated Purdue Fort Wayne, Milwaukee, and Oakland to win the tournament championship. As a result, they received the conference's automatic bid to the NCAA tournament, their first appearance since 2009 and the school's third bid to the tournament. As the No. 15 seed in the Midwest Region, they lost to Houston in the first round.

Roster

Schedule and results

|-
!colspan=12 style=| Exhibition

|-
!colspan=12 style=| Regular season

|-
!colspan=9 style=| Horizon League tournament

|-
!colspan=9 style=| National Invitation tournament

Sources

References

Cleveland State Vikings men's basketball seasons
Cleveland State Vikings
Cleveland State Vikings men's basketball
Cleveland State Vikings men's basketball
Cleveland State